Aleksandrowice may refer to the following places in Poland:
Aleksandrowice, Lower Silesian Voivodeship (south-west Poland)
Aleksandrowice, Lesser Poland Voivodeship (south Poland)
Aleksandrowice, Bielsko-Biała (south Poland)